Chopta is a small region of meadows and evergreen forest area, a part of Kedarnath wildlife sanctuary located in Uttarakhand state, India and a base for trekking to Tungnath, the third temple of Panch Kedar which lies  away.

Chopta is an unspoiled natural destination lying in the lap of the Uttarakhand Himalayas and offers views of the imposing Himalayan range including Trishul, Nanda Devi and Chaukhamba. Chopta village is surrounded by forests of pine, deodar and rhododendron and is rich in flora and fauna include rare species of birds and musk deer.

Location
This place is popularly known as 'Mini Switzerland'. The best time to visit this hillside is from April to November. Chopta is also a popular destination during the winter months due to the snowfall that the area experiences. Tungnath temple and Chandrashila are covered with snow from December to March. Chopta can be reached from Rishikesh via Rudraprayag, Kund, Ukhimath OR via Rudraprayag, Karnprayag, Chamoli, Gopeshwar, Mandal.

Chopta is simply accessible as it is situated on the road connecting Gopeshwar with Guptkashi. Wake up with cool healthy breeze and chirping of birds in Chopta. The morning view from Chopta is invigorating when the crimson rays of the sun kiss the snow-laden Himalayas.

Activities
The Chopta - Tungnath - Chandrashila trek is a destinations for trekkers. The Chopta region has many treks and trails cutting through jungles and grasslands. Chandrashilla, Tunganath and Devariyatal are the best known trekking routes in the Chopta region. Because of an abundance of birds, Chopta is popular among birdwatchers.

Some activities in Chopta
 Camping and trekking, yoga, survival activity
 Snow trekking, snow skiing
 Rock craft, rock climbing, rappelling 
 Photography of rare Himalayan species of monal bird, musk deer and pika mouse.

Trekking 
The trek to Chopta, which can be extended to climbing the Chandrashila Peak, is a popular adventure trip among hiking lovers. Since the route lies in a protected area, the journey takes one through enchanting forests with panoramic views of the Himalayas, far from the maddening crowds. The best time to start a trek for Chandrashila peak is in the morning as around afternoon clouds and rain can smudge the beautiful 360 degrees view of the entire Himalayan valley from the peak. The town of Kund in Uttarakhand is the usual starting point and the entire tour can be done in 3-5 days, making it a preferred activity for city dwellers in India seeking a short getaway. The general pit stops are as follows:
 Kund to Deoriatal (3-5 hours trek) - start at Kund, a quaint town situated at 1,350 m, approximately 200 km away from the spiritual town of Haridwar. 
 Deoriatal to Chopta (4-5 hours trek) 
 Chopta to Chandrashila Peak (4,000 m), via Tungnath Temple and back (4-5 hours trek). The distance from Tungnath Temple to Chandrashila peak is only 1 km and serves as a highlight of the trip. Though the distance is less, it takes time as it is relatively steep.

The return journey from Chopta to Kund can be on foot by retracing the path or in a car.

Places of interest
 Dense forest of Kedarnath Wild Life Sanctuary; where temperate and alpine trees are found in abundance. Trees like, oak, pine, burans and other himalayan species occupy major land part of Chopta, Uttarakhand region.
 Flora and fauna with high diversity
 Grass land patches (Bugyal/ Meadows) 
 Chandrashilla peak 4090 m
 Tungnath temple at 3680 m
 Deoria Tal (lake) at 2350 m
 Atrimuni falls
 Visibility of 41 Himalayan peaks - Meru, Sumeru, Ganesh Parwat, Chaukhamba, Bandarpunch, Nilkantha, Tirsuli, Nanda Devi etc. and Panoramic view of Himalayan mountain range.

Seasons to visit
It is a place that is yet to be fully explored and one of the best hill stations in India. Chopta is a must visit destination for nature lovers and those who are passionate for trekking. Chopta has a very cool and pleasant climate from March to May with the temperature between 10 °C and 30 °C. After that comes monsoon season that starts from July and ends in October. Chopta witnesses snowfall from November to March and the temperature is between a minimum of −15 °C and a maximum of 15 °C. It starts snowing in the month of November and increases significantly day by day. By January it is a 4- to 7-foot-thick layer of snowfall. It is fully covered with snow during winters and during the same time, some of the routes going to Chopta are blocked. An alternative route to Chopta is from Deoria Tal, which is 10–12 km trek that starts from Deorial Tal. Deoria Tal can be approached from Saari Village. It can be taken during winter season. So, trekkers must visit the place during winters if they want to see snowfields.

Summertime in Chopta does not offer clear view of Himalayas due to cloudy weather from June to August. All the peaks are covered in clouds and the view is unclear. During winters, the sky is crystal clear and all the mountains are clearly visible. It amazingly offers a 360-degree view of snow-clad mountains.

Sanitation
In September 2020, the Uttarakhand state's tourism department, as part of an initiative, decided to provide mobile toilets in tourist spots lacking this facility. One such toilet is to be built in Chopta-Tungnath.

Gallery

See also
Chandrashila
Deoria Tal
Tungnath
Ukhimath
Mandal
Gopeshwar

References

Hiking trails in Uttarakhand
Villages in Rudraprayag district